Gaston Chapel is a historic African Methodist Episcopal church located at 100 Bouchelle Street in Morganton, Burke County, North Carolina.  It was built from 1900 to 1911, and is a brick church building with a high-pitched hip roof and Late Gothic Revival style design influences.  It features a Gothic-arched tripartite stained-glass window.  It is the oldest extant, and first substantial, African-American church structure in Burke County.

It was listed on the National Register of Historic Places in 1984.

References

External links

Churches on the National Register of Historic Places in North Carolina
Gothic Revival church buildings in North Carolina
Churches completed in 1900
19th-century churches in the United States
Churches in Burke County, North Carolina
National Register of Historic Places in Burke County, North Carolina